Ayawaso West or Ayawaso West Wuogon is one of the constituencies in Accra represented in the Parliament of Ghana. It elects one Member of Parliament (MP) by the first past the post system of election. Ayawaso West is located in the Accra Metropolitan Area of the Greater Accra Region of Ghana.

Members of Parliament

Elections

Following the death of her husband, Lydia Alhassan stood for and won the by-election for his seat.

See also
List of Ghana Parliament constituencies

References 

Parliamentary constituencies in the Greater Accra Region